Malton may refer to:

Places
Malton, California, United States
Malton, North Yorkshire, England
Malton (UK Parliament constituency)
Malton, Ontario, Canada
Malton GO Station, station in the GO Transit network located in the community
A fictional town featured in the MMORPG Urban Dead
Malton Range, a mountain range in Canada

People
Thomas Malton (born 1748), English painter of topographical and architectural views, and an engraver
James Malton (died 1803), architectural draughtsman, son of Thomas Malton
Jackie Malton (born 1951), UK television script consultant and former senior police officer
Chris Malton (born 1969), English cricketer